It B1A4 is the second mini-album released by B1A4 and released by WM Entertainment released on September 16, 2011.

Track listing

Chart

References

 http://www.yesasia.com/us/b1a4-mini-album-vol-2-it-b1a4/1024945565-0-0-0-en/info.html YESASIA. Retrieved 2011-12-11
 http://www.dkpopnews.net/2011/09/info-b1a4-2nd-mini-album-it-b1a4.html DKPOPNEWS. Retrieved 2011-12-12

2011 EPs
B1A4 EPs
Korean-language EPs